Thomas Powys, 2nd Baron Lilford (8 April 1775 – 4 July 1825) was a British peer. He was the son of Thomas Powys, 1st Baron Lilford and Mary Mann of Lilford Hall. He succeeded his father as Baron Lilford in 1800. He was educated at Eton College, St John's College, Cambridge and Lincoln's Inn (1794).

He married Henrietta Maria Vernon Atherton of Atherton Hall, Leigh on 5 December 1797 at Penwortham, Lancashire and they had twelve children.

Henrietta Maria Atherton (née Legh) inherited Bank Hall which had come to her mother from a first cousin, George Anthony Legh Keck and the Atherton Hall via her father Robert Vernon Atherton Gwillym. He was appointed a deputy lieutenant of Northamptonshire on 9 May 1803.
Thomas died at Grosvenor Place on 4 July 1825 and was buried on 15 July 1835, at Achurch, Northamptonshire. His fifth Son Henry Littleton Powys inherited Stoughton Grange, Leicestershire.

References

1775 births
1825 deaths
People educated at Eton College
Alumni of St John's College, Cambridge
Thomas 2
Deputy Lieutenants of Northamptonshire
English barristers